640 Brambilla is a minor planet orbiting the Sun.

References

External links
 
 

Background asteroids
Brambilla
19070829
G-type asteroids (Tholen)
Brambilla